Mabel A. Barbee Lee (1884–1978) was an American writer, teacher at Victor High School, and administrator of Colorado College, the University of California in Berkeley, and other institutions.

Biography
Mabel was born in Silver Reef, Utah, on April 11, 1884, and later grew up in Cripple Creek, Colorado. She attended Colorado College before she started her career as a teacher. She married mining engineer Howard Shields Lee on June 15, 1908 in Denver, Colorado, and followed him to mining areas across the continent. He died in 1918 during an influenza outbreak and she went on to become dean of women at Colorado College from 1922 to 1929. She then served as administrator at Bennington College, Radcliffe, Whitman, and the University of California, Berkeley. She then returned to Colorado and visited Cripple Creek in order to write Cripple Creek Days. She wrote a few more books before she died in Santa Barbara, California, on December 12, 1978. There is an archive of her manuscripts in the Western History and Genealogy Department at the Denver Public Library and another, with her correspondence with Lowell Thomas at the Colorado College Library.

In 1930, she wrote an article titled "Censoring the Conduct of College Women" that was published in Atlantic Monthly.

In 1959, she appeared on This Is Your Life as a part of the life of Lowell Thomas, her former Victor High School English student.

She is buried with her parents, Johnson R. Barbee and Katherine "Kitty" Appleby, in Mount Pisgah Cemetery, Cripple Creek, Colorado.

Published works
Cripple Creek Days, 1958 Foreword by Lowell Thomas
And Suddenly It's Evening, A Fragment of Life, 1963
The Rainbow Years, 1966
Back in Cripple Creek, 1968
The Gardens in My Life; An Intimate Memoir, 1970

Awards
1958: Spur Award for Best Nonfiction, Cripple Creek Days

References

1884 births
1978 deaths
20th-century American historians
Colorado College alumni
Writers from Colorado
Writers from Utah
People from Washington County, Utah
American women historians
20th-century American women writers
People from Cripple Creek, Colorado